"Open Season (Une autre saison)" is a song by Josef Salvat released in 2015.

Charts

References

2015 singles
2015 songs